ABM College is a Canadian career college with main campuses in both Calgary, Alberta, and North York, Ontario, as well as online programs to provide "education that gets you hired". The programs offered by ABM College are licensed by the Ministry of Career Colleges and Universities in Alberta and Ontario. ABM College offers programs in Health Care, Business, and Technology, which lead to certification or a diploma upon graduation. While enrolled, students receive a combination of applied in-class training, lab simulations, and practicum experience. The Calgary campus features computer and health care labs, along with a public student massage therapy practice.

This college also offers virtual classroom learning as an alternative to in-class instruction. All of the programs are offered either digitally, traditionally or a blend of the two, have year-round monthly intakes, and are offered during the day, evenings, or on weekends. Students also have access to employment services, career counselling and preparation, and other support and resources to ensure their career success.

Programs

ABM College offers programs in Health Care, Business, and Technology. It has the authority to grant certificates and diplomas.

Calgary Campus
Health Care: 
Health Care Aide Certificate,
Medical Office Assistant & Unit Clerk Diploma,
Massage Therapy & Advanced Massage Therapy Diploma,
Pharmacy Assistant Diploma,
Addictions & Community Support Worker Diploma,
First Aid & CPR (training course),
Business: 
Business Administration Diploma,
Accounting & Payroll Administration Diploma,
Administrative Assistant Diploma,
Education Assistant Diploma,
Legal Assistant Diploma,
Digital Marketing Diploma,
Technology:
Graphic Design Diploma,
Mobile Application Developer Diploma,
Network Administrator Diploma,
Web Design & Development Diploma,
Help Desk Analyst Diploma,
Tekla Structures Software (training course),

Toronto Campus
Health Care:
Personal Support Worker Certificate,

ABM College programs are licensed by Alberta Advanced Education,  and licensed by the Ministry of Training, Colleges and Universities (Ontario)

History
ABM College, formerly known as ABM College of Health and Technology, was established in 2011, in Calgary and Toronto, as a private educational institute focused on providing high quality education which leads to successfully employed alumni. The college's full legal name is ABM College of Business and Technology Inc., but is operating as ABM College.

See also
Education in Alberta
List of colleges in Alberta
List of universities and colleges in Alberta

References

Universities and colleges in Calgary
Colleges in Alberta
Vocational education in Canada
2011 establishments in Alberta
Educational institutions established in 2011